Spanish cuisine consists of the cooking traditions and practices from Spain. Olive oil (of which Spain is the world's largest producer) is heavily used in Spanish cuisine. It forms the base of many vegetable sauces (known in Spanish as sofritos). Herbs most commonly used include parsley, oregano, rosemary and thyme. The use of garlic has been noted as common in Spanish cooking. The most used meats in Spanish cuisine include chicken, pork, lamb and veal. Fish and seafood are also consumed on a regular basis. Tapas are snacks and appetizers commonly served with drinks in bars and cafes.

History

Antiquity 

Authors like Strabo wrote about aboriginal people of Spain using nuts and acorns as staple food. The extension of the vines along the Mediterranean seems to be due to the colonization of the Greeks and the Phoenicians who introduced the cultivation of olive oil. Spain is the largest producer of olive oil in the world. The growing of crops of the so-called tríada mediterránea (the "Mediterranean triad": wheat, grapevines, and olives) underpinned the staple meal products for the inhabitants of the south of the Iberian Peninsula during the Roman Era (bread, wine and oil).

Middle Ages 
The Visigoths’ limited but lasting contributions to Spanish cuisine include the spread of consumption of fermented milk and the preference for avoiding the mixing of water and wine.

Rice was possibly introduced for the first time by Byzantines in the Iberian Peninsula by the 6th century, while, following the Muslim conquest of the Iberian peninsula in the 8th century, Arabs expanded rice cultivation, bringing new irrigation techniques originally from the Indian subcontinent that also allowed for the cultivation of crops such as sugar cane, watermelon, lemon and oranges. Other ingredients introduced in the Iberian Peninsula during the Hispano-Muslim period include sorghum, spinach, eggplant, peach, apricot and saffron.
The most famous Spanish dish, paella, uses two ingredients introduced by the Moors, rice and saffron.

Moors also developed the basis for the art of pastry-making and introduced escabeche, a food preservation technique relying on vinegar. Dishes like ajo blanco, alboronía, alajú, hallulla,  albóndigas, mojama, arrope, are some of the many legacies of Moorish cuisine. Although Muslim religion does not allow alcoholic drinks, the consumption of wine was widespread as the Qur'anic precepts never got to overrule the preexisting traditions in this regard. There are many accounts of the "drinking chats" of Abd al-Rahman II, Abd al-Rahman III and Almanzor. Almodrote (a formerly popular sauce preparation out of vogue since the late 17th century) was a Sephardic recipe in origin. Observing the kashrut regulations, Jews and judaizantes opted for blood-drained meat and without fat, outright rejecting bacon. Potajes were an important part of the Jewish cuisine in the Middle Ages, most notably adafina, a local name for a ḥamin dish,  along with other Jewish culinary legacies in Spain since.
The cookbook history in the country might be traced back to works such as the Llibre de Sent Soví (1324) and Ruperto de Nola's Llibre de Coch (1520), both written in the Catalan language.

Modern era 

The arrival of Europeans to the Americas in 1492 initiated the advent of new culinary elements, such as tomatoes, potatoes, maize, bell peppers, spicy peppers, paprika, vanilla and cocoa, or chocolate. Spain is where chocolate was first mixed with sugar to temper its natural bitterness. Other ingredients traveled to the Americas, such as rice, grapes, olives and many types of cereals. Spain was the bridge for the Columbian exchange between the rest of Europe and the New World.

Influenced by Arabic harisa, grain-based soups such as farinetes (along the Mediterranean coast) and, similarly, gachas (in Castile) were customary in Early Modern Spain.

Foreign visitors noted with disdain the Spaniards' use of olive oil and (pig's) lard for cooking rather than their preferred (cow's) butter. The latter was barely available and, according to the 17th-century account of Madame d'Aulnoy, on the rare occasions that it was, would come "from afar, preserved in pig's tripes and full of worms". Butter was only produced locally in places such as Galicia, Asturias and Soria, or was imported, preserved in potassium nitrate, (the so-called "Flanders' butter").

By the 18th century, many American ingredients, such as peppers and tomatoes, had been already fully incorporated to the Spanish cuisine, bringing new strong flavours; contemporary foreign visitors such as French ambassador Jean-François de Bourgoing, judged negatively this gastronomic synthesis happening in Spain by the late part of the century: "Spanish cooking, which they have inherited, is not generally pleasing to foreigners. Spaniards like strong condiments such as pepper, tomato sauce, hot peppers and saffron, which color or infect nearly all their dishes".

Many traditional Spanish dishes such as tortilla de patata (an omelette made with potatoes), would not be possible without the Columbian exchange. Gazpacho, salmorejo, and pan con tomate are made with tomatoes, which traveled from the New World to the Old World.

For most of the 19th century, the aristocracy consumed a set of dishes that was largely an imitation of French cuisine. That was the available cuisine at the time, together with the degeneration of regional cuisines. A positive foreign take on the Spanish dishes opposing the largely negative views from foreign commentators was that of Richard Ford, fond of Spanish specialties such as Sherry and ham.

Modern Spanish cuisine was gestated in the late 19th to early 20th century, with gastronomes and writers such as Mariano Pardo de Figueroa (Dr. Thebussem), José Castro y Serrano, Ángel Muro, Emilia Pardo Bazán and Dionisio Pérez, some of which put an effort in developing the idea of a "national cuisine" recognisable by Spaniards as their own.

Keen on participating in the Spanish nation-building process, Dr. Thebussem, in an autochthonous example of culinary nationalism, proposed to the King's Chef that the olla podrida (a rustic stew typically made of meat, legumes and other vegetables) should be served at official banquets as a national dish. This can be considered as an important step to stray away from the French cooking paradigm, hegemonic in the 19th century in Europe. Olla podrida had been indeed previously ridiculed in foreign (most notably French) satires.

Although the new foodscape built in opposition to the French centralist culinary model accounted for the awareness of the distinctive regional singularities, subsequent food writers in the country would continue to cope with the tension between the Spanish peripheral and centralist foodscapes.

The extremely influential cooking book 1080 recetas de cocina by Simone Ortega (first published in 1972) became a hit in Spain, remaining as of 2019 the third best-selling book ever in the history of the country after Don Quixote and the Bible. This was however not a book exclusively of Spanish traditional recipes, but to a large extent it included French recipes, bringing an exotic penchant to the Spanish homes.

Televised cooking shows started in the country in 1984 with Con las manos en la masa.

Meal routines 

A continental-style breakfast (desayuno) may be taken just after waking up, or before entering the workplace. Common products taken during breakfast include coffee, milk, chocolate drink, biscuits (most notably Marie biscuits), magdalenas, toasts (featuring ingredients such as oil, tomato and butter, bread toasts are a staple part of the desayuno either consumed at home or in bars) or churros.

Due to the large time span between breakfast and lunch, it is not uncommon to halt the working schedule to take a mid-morning snack.

Lunch (el almuerzo or simply la comida, literally meaning "the food"), the large midday meal in Spain, contains several courses, especially in restaurants. In some regions of Spain, the word almuerzo refers to the mid-morning snack, instead of lunch. Lunch usually starts between 2:00 pm or 2:30 pm finishing around 3:00 pm to 3:30 pm, and is usually followed by sobremesa, which refers to the table talk that Spanish people undertake. Menus are organized according to these courses and include five or six choices in each course. At home, Spanish meals would contain one or two courses and a dessert. The content of this meal is usually a soup dish, salad, a meat or a fish dish and a dessert such as fruit, yoghurt or something sweet. Tapas may also be typically served before or during lunch.

In recent years, the Spanish government took action to shorten the lunch break, in order to end the working day earlier. Most businesses shut down for two or three hours for lunch, then resume the working day until dinner time in the evening.

La cena, meaning both dinner or supper, is taken between 8:30pm and 11pm. It typically consists of one course and dessert. Due to the large time span between lunch and dinner, an afternoon snack, la merienda, equivalent to afternoon tea, may take place at about 6pm. At merienda, people would typically drink coffee, eat something sweet, a sandwich or a piece of fruit.

Some country-wide staple dishes common throughout Spain include croquetas (croquettes), paella (a rice dish incorporating different ingredients as it moves away from the area of origin in the Valencia region), ensaladilla rusa (the local name for the Olivier salad), gazpacho (a vegetable cold soup) and tortilla de patatas (Spanish omelette). There is a disagreement in Spanish society when it comes to preferring onion as an ingredient in the Spanish omelette, often accompanied by exclusionary and vehement takes by either side.

Appetizers right before lunch or dinner, or during them, are common in the form of tapas (small portions). It is common for tapas to be provided as a complimentary appetizer in bars and cafes when ordering a drink. Aside from some of the aforementioned specialties, other signature tapas include: mejillones en escabeche (marinated mussels), gildas, albóndigas (meatballs), callos, torreznos or raxo de cerdo.

Regional cuisines

Andalusia 

Andalusian cuisine is twofold: rural and coastal. Of all the Spanish regions, this region uses the most olive oil in its cuisine. The Andalusian dish that has achieved the most international fame is gazpacho, from Hispanic Arabic gazpáčo. It is a cold soup made with five vegetables, vinegar, water, salt, olive oil, and stale bread crumbs. Other cold soups include poleá, zoque and salmorejo.

Snacks made with olives are common. Meat dishes include flamenquín, pringá, oxtail stew, and menudo gitano (also called Andalusian tripe). Hot soups include sopa de gato (made with bread), caldillo de perro (fish soup with orange juice) and migas canas. Fish dishes include pescaíto frito, soldaditos de Pavía, and parpandúa. A culinary custom is the typical Andalusian breakfast, which is considered to be a traditional characteristic of laborers which is extending throughout Spain.

Cured meats include Serrano ham and Iberico ham. Typical drinks in the area include anise, wine (such as Malaga, Jerez, and Pedro Ximénez), and sherry brandy.

Aragon 

Aragonese cuisine has a rural and mountainous origin. The central part of Aragon, the flattest, is the richest in culinary specialties. Being in a land where lambs are raised on the slopes of the Pyrenees, one of its most famous dishes is roast lamb, or asado de ternasco. The lamb is cooked with garlic, salt, and bacon fat. Pork dishes are also very popular. Among them, roasted pork leg, and almojábanas de cerdo. The most notable condiment is garlic oil.

Legumes are very important, but the most popular vegetables are borage and thistle. In terms of cured meats,  and also ham from Huesca are used often. Among the cheeses,  is notable. Fruit-based cuisine includes the very popular fruits of Aragon (Spanish: frutas de Aragon, which are candied fruits) and maraschino cherries.

Asturias 

Asturian cuisine has a long and rich history, deeply rooted in Celtic traditions of Atlantic Europe. One of its most famous dishes is fabada asturiana. Fabada is the traditional stew of the region, made with white beans, sausages (such as chorizo and ), and pork. A well-known recipe is fabes con almejas (beans with clams). Asturian beans (fabes) can also be cooked with hare, partridge, prawns, or octopus.

Fish and seafood play an important role in Asturian cuisine. The Cantabrian Sea provides a rich variety of species, including tuna, hake and sardines.

Asturian cheeses are very popular in the rest of Spain. Among them, the most representative is Cabrales cheese, a pungent, blue cheese developed in the regions near the Picos de Europa. These can be enjoyed with the local cider, a low-alcohol drink made of Asturian apples, with a distinctive sourness.

Asturian cider, made of a special type of apple, is traditionally poured escanciada from a certain height, usually over the head of the waiter/server: one hand holds the glass, slightly tilted, under the hip, while the other hand throws the cider from atop, the arm usually stretched upwards. When the cider falls into the glass from above, the drink "breaks", getting aerated and bubbly. It is consumed immediately after being served, in consecutive, tiny shots.

Balearic Islands 

Balearic cuisine has purely Mediterranean characteristics due to its location. The islands have been conquered several times throughout their history by the French and the English, which left some culinary influences. Some well known food items are the sobrassada, mahón cheese, gin de Menorca (pelota), and mayonnaise. Among the dishes are tumbet, and roasted suckling pig. Popular deserts include ensaïmada, tambor d'ametlla, and suspiros de Manacor. Balearic food is an example of the famous Mediterranean diet due to the importance of olive oil, legumes, unrefined cereals, fruits, vegetables and fish.

Basque Country 

The cuisine of the Basque Country has a wide and varied range of ingredients and preparations. The culture of eating is very strong among the inhabitants of this region. Highlights include meat and fish dishes. Also popular are anchovies, bream, and bonito. Common meat dishes are beef steaks, pork loin with milk, fig leaf quail, and marinated goose.

Txakoli or chacolí (a white wine characterised by its high acidity and a lesser-than-average alcohol content) is a staple drink from the Basque Country, produced in Álava and Biscay.

Canary Islands 

The Canary Islands have a unique cuisine due to their geographical location in the Atlantic ocean. The Canary Islands were part of the trading routes to the Americas, hence creating a melting pot of different culinary traditions. Fish (fresh or salted) and potatoes are among the most common staple foods in the islands. The consumption of cheese, fruits, and pork meat also characterizes Canarian cuisine. The closeness to Africa influences climate and creates a range of warm temperatures that in modern times have fostered the agriculture of tropical and semitropical crops: bananas, yams, mangoes, avocados, and persimmons which are heavily used in Canarian cuisine.

The aboriginal people, Guanches, based their diet on gofio (a type of flour made of different toasted grains), shellfish, and goat and pork products. Gofio is still consumed in the islands and has become part of the traditional cuisine.

A sauce called mojo is very common throughout the islands. It has been adapted and developed in many ways, so that it may complement various main dishes. Fish dishes usually require a "green mojo" made from coriander or parsley, while roasted meats require a red variety made from chilli peppers that are commonly known as mojo picón.

Some classic dishes in the Canary Islands include papas arrugadas, almogrote, frangollo, rabbit in "salmorejo sauce", and stewed goat.

Some popular desserts are: truchas (pastries filled with sweet potato or pumpkin), roasted gofio (a gofio-based dough with nuts and honey), príncipe Alberto (a mousse-like preparation with almonds, coffee, and chocolate), and quesillo (a variety of flan made with condensed milk).

Wineries are common in the islands. However, only Malvasia wine from Lanzarote has gained international recognition.

Cantabria 

A popular Cantabrian dish is cocido montañés (highlander stew), a rich stew made with beans, cabbage, and pork.

Recognized quality meats are Tudanca veal and game meat.

Cantabrian pastries include sobaos and quesadas pasiegas.

Orujo is the Cantabrian pomace brandy. Cider (sidra) and chacoli wine are also favorites.

Cantabria has two wines labelled DOC: Costa de Cantabria and Liébana.

Castile-La Mancha 

In Castilla-La Mancha, the culinary habits reflect the origin of foods eaten by shepherds and peasants. It is said that the best La Mancha cuisine cookbook is the novel Don Quixote by Miguel de Cervantes. Wheat and grains are a dominant product and ingredient. They are used in bread, soups, gazpacho manchego, crumbs, porridge, etc.

Manchego cheese is also renowned.

Given the fact that its lands are dry, and thus unable to sustain large amounts of cattle living on grass, an abundance of small animals, such as rabbit, and especially birds (pheasant, quail, partridge, squab), can be found. This led to game meat being incorporated into traditional dishes, such as conejo al Ajillo (rabbit in garlic sauce),  (marinated partridge) or huevos de codorniz  (quail eggs)).

Castile and León 

In Castile and León characteristic dishes include morcilla, (a black pudding made with special spices), sopa de ajo (garlic soup), Cochinillo asado (roast piglet), lechazo (roast lamb), botillo del Bierzo, hornazo from Salamanca,  (a cured ham from Guijuelo, Salamanca), other sausages, Serrada cheese, and Ribera del Duero wines.

Major wines in Castilian-Leonese cuisine include the robust wine of Toro, reds from Ribera del Duero, whites from Rueda, and clarets from Cigales.

Catalonia 

The cuisine of Catalonia is based in a rural culture; it is very extensive and has great culinary wealth. It features cuisine from three climates: coastal (seafood), mountains, and the interiors. Some famous dishes include escudella, pa amb tomàquet, bean omelette, samfaina, thyme soup, and caragols a la llauna. Notable sauces are romesco sauce, aioli, bouillabaisse of Catalan origin and picada.

Cured pork cuisine includes botifarra (white and black) and the fuet of Vic.

Fish dishes include  (fish stew), cod stew, and arròs negre.

Among the vegetable dishes, the most famous are calçots and escalivada (roasted vegetables).

Desserts dishes include Catalan cream, carquinyolis, panellets, tortell, and neules.

La Rioja 
La Rioja is recognized by the use of meats such as pork and cold cuts, which are produced after the traditional slaughter. Lamb is perhaps the second most popular meat product in this region. Veal is common in mountainous areas. Another well-known dish is caparrones, Rioja stew. The most famous dish is Rioja style potatoes and fritada. Lesser-known dishes are Holy lunch and ajo huevo (garlic eggs). Pimientos asados (roasted peppers) is a notable vegetable dish.

La Rioja is famously known in Spain for its red wine, so most of these dishes are served with wine. Rioja wine has designated origin status.

Extremadura 

The cuisine of Extremadura is austere, with dishes prepared by shepherds. It is very similar to the cuisine of Castilla. Extremaduran cuisine is abundant in pork; it is said that the region is one of the best for breeding pigs in Spain, thanks to the acorns that grow in their fields. Iberian pig herds raised in the fields of Montánchez are characterized by dark skin and thin legs. This breed of pig is found exclusively in Southwestern Iberia, both in Spain and Portugal.

Other meat dishes are lamb stew or goat stew (caldereta de cordero and caldereta de cabrito). Highlights include game meats, such as wild boar, partridge, pheasant, or venison.

Distinctive cheeses from the region include the so-called quesos de torta, sheep milk cheeses typically curdled with the infusion of thistle: both the torta of La Serena and the torta of El Casar enjoy a protected designation of origin. Among the desserts are leche frita, and pestiños (fritters), as well as many sweets that have their origins in convents.

Cod preparations are known, and tench is among the most traditional freshwater fish, with fish and vegetable dishes such as moje de peces or escarapuche.

Soups are often bread-based and include a variety of both hot and cold ones. Pennyroyal mint is sometimes used to season gazpachos or soups such as sopa de poleo. Extremaduran ajoblanco (ajoblanco extremeño) is a cold soup different from Andalusian ajoblanco since it contains egg yolk in the emulsion and vegetables but no almonds.

The Northeastern comarca of La Vera produces , smoked paprika highly valued all over Spain and extensively used in Extremaduran cuisine.

The region is also known for its vino de pitarra tradition, home-made wine made in small earthenware vessels.

Galicia 

Galician cuisine is known in Spanish territory because of the emigration of its inhabitants. Similarly to neighbouring Asturias, Galicia shares some culinary traditions in stews and soups with the Celtic nations of Atlantic Europe. One of the most noted Galician dishes is soup. Also notable is pork with turnip tops, a popular component of the Galician carnival meal laconadas. Pork products are also popular.

The seafood dishes are very famous and rich in variety. Among these are the Galician empanadas, octopus, scallops, crab, and barnacles. 
In the city of Santiago de Compostela, located along an ancient pilgrim trail from the Pyrenees, it was customary for travellers to first eat scallops upon arriving in the city.

Among the many dairy products is queso de tetilla.

The queimadas (a folkloric preparation of orujo) consists of mixing of the alcoholic beverage with peels of orange or lemon, sugar or coffee beans, prepared in a nearly ritual ceremony involving the flambé of the beverage.

Cattle breeding is very common in Galicia, therefore, a lot of red meat is consumed, typically with potatoes.

Madrid 

Madrid did not gain its own identity in the Court until 1561, when Philip II moved the capital to Madrid. Since then, due to immigration, many of Madrid's culinary dishes have been made from modifications to dishes from other Spanish regions. Madrid, due to the influx of visitors from the nineteenth century onwards, was one of the first cities to introduce the concept of the restaurant, hosting some of the earliest examples.

Murcia 

The cuisine of the region of Murcia has two sides with the influence of Manchego cuisine. The region of Murcia is famous for its varied fruit production. Among the most outstanding dishes are: tortilla murciana, zarangollo, mojete, aubergine a la crème, pipirrana, etc. A typical sauce of this area is ajo cabañil, used to accompany meat dishes.

Regional dishes include michirones (beans cooked with bay leaves, hot peppers and garlic), olla gitana, cocido murciano con pelotas, sopa de mondongo, and others.

Some meat products from Murcia are morcilla (black pudding), which is flavored with oregano, and pastel murciano, made with ground beef.

Among fish and seafood are the golden salt, Mar Menor prawns and baked octopus.

Rice dishes are common and include caldero, arroz empedrado, paella Valenciana (rice with rabbit and snails), arroz de escribano, and arroz viudo.

Among confectionery products are exploradores and pastel de Cierva. They are typical in Murcia gastronomy and are found in almost every pastry shop in Murcia. They are both sweet and savoury at the same time.

Desserts are abundant; among them are paparajotes, Orchard, stuffed pastries, and others.

This region also has wine appellation of origin, as the wine from Jumilla, Bullas wine and wine Yecla.

Navarra 

The gastronomy of Navarra has many similarities with Basque cuisine. Two of its flag dishes are trucha a la navarra (Navarra-style trout) and ajoarriero, although we must not forget the cordero en chilindrón or relleno. There are very curious recipes such as the Carlists eggs.

Salted products are common and include chorizo de Pamplona, stuffing and sausage. The lamb and beef have, at present, designations of origin. Among the dairy products are Roncal cheese, the curd or Idiazabal cheese. Typical alcoholic drinks include claret and pacharán.

Valencia 

The cuisine of Valencia has two components, the rural (products of the field) and the coastal (seafood). One popular Valencia creation is paella, a rice dish cooked in a circular pan and topped with vegetables and meats (originally rabbit and chicken). Dishes such as arroz con costra, arròs negre, fideuá, arròz al horn, and rice with beans and turnips are also common in the city.

Coastal towns supply the region with fish, leading to popular dishes like all i pebre (fish stew), typical of the Albufera.

Among the desserts are coffee liqueur, chocolate Alicante, and arnadí and horchata, both of Muslim origin. Notably, during Christmas, nougat is made in Alicante and Jijona; also well-known are peladillas (almonds wrapped in a thick layer of caramel).

Customs
It is traditional to prepare and eat small honey cakes (galletas de miel) for the feast of Corpus Christi.

Notable Spanish chefs 

 Ferran Adrià of El Bulli, Girona (closed). 
 Juan Mari Arzak, Arzak, San Sebastián, Guipúzcoa (1989).
 Santi Santamaría, El Raco, Can Fabes, Barcelona (1994).
 Martín Berasategui Berasategui Lasarte, Guipúzcoa (2001).
 Carme Ruscalleda Sant Pau Sant Pol de Mar, Barcelona (2006).
 José Andrés Minibar by José Andrés Washington D.C. Andres is a student of Adrià. He hosts Made in Spain on PBS.
 Karlos Arguiñano, celebrity television chef.
 Sergi Arola, La Broché, Arola and Sergi Arola Gastro. Arola is a student of Adrià who has been awarded two Michelin stars.
 Penelope Casas, New York-born cookbook author.
 Carlos Dominguez Cidon (León 1959–2009), recipient of the "Premio Alimentos" award in 1999 and Michelin Guiding Star award in 2004; author of eight books.
 María Mestayer de Echagüe (Bilbao b. 1878 d. 1956), also known as "Marquesa de Parabere", the author of a two-volume cooking encyclopaedia entitled La Cocina Completa. There are sections dedicated to the pantry and table etiquette.
 Ángel Muro, a 19th-century food expert and author of the book Practicón.
 Simone and Ines Ortega, authors of 1080 recetas (1080 Recipes).
 Manuel Maria Puga and Parga, an early 20th century food expert and author of La cocina práctica.
 Ilan Hall, Casa Mono, Manhattan, NY, winner of Top Chef Season 2. 
 Joan Roca, Jordi Roca i Fontané and Josep Roca i Fontané. El Celler de Can Roca, "Rocambolesc", "Can Roca", "Mas Marroch" and "Cap Roig", in the province of Girona, and he restaurant "Roca Barcelona" in the province of Barcelona. Three Michelin stars in 2009. In 2013, El Celler de Can Roca was selected as the best restaurant in the world by Restaurant magazine.

See also

 Early impact of Mesoamerican goods in Iberian society
 List of Spanish desserts
 List of Spanish dishes
 List of Spanish soups and stews
 Agriculture in Spain
 List of Spanish cheeses
 Bread culture in Spain
 List of cuisines
 Mediterranean cuisine
 European cuisine

References

External links
Foods and Wines from Spain

 
Mediterranean cuisine